The Salmon River Mountains are a major mountain range covering most of the central part of the U.S. state of Idaho. Part of the central Rocky Mountains, the entire range lies west of the Continental Divide of the Americas and drains to the Snake River.

The mountains are an extensive block-shaped massif in central Idaho, with their western boundary defined by the Little Salmon River and the northern and eastern boundary marked by the main stem Salmon. The West Salmon River Mountains lie between the Little and South Forks of the Salmon, the Central range is between the South and Middle Forks, and the East range is defined by the mountains east of the Middle Fork of the Salmon.

The southeastern portion of the range is bounded by the White Knob Mountains, Pioneer Mountains, Bould Mountains, and the basins of Marsh Creek, Valley Creek and Warm Spring Creek. The southwestern boundaries are formed by forks of the Payette River, also a Snake River tributary. The height of the mountains gradually increases from west to east, sloping up towards the Continental Divide.

References

Mountain ranges of Idaho